The Skalnaté pleso Observatory (obs. code: 056) is an astronomical and meteorological observatory in the Tatra Mountains of Slovakia. The observatory is named after a nearby mountain lake (Skalnaté pleso, literally: "Rocky Tarn").

Description 

The observatory produced the popular sky atlas Skalnate Pleso Atlas of the Heavens by Antonín Bečvář, who founded the observatory in 1943. It is also known for its visual comet hunting and for its astrometric observations and discoveries of minor planets. The asteroid 2619 Skalnaté Pleso was named in honor of the observatory.

Noted astronomers who worked at the observatory include Milan Antal, Antonín Mrkos, Ľudmila Pajdušáková and Margita Kresáková (née Vozárová), as well as Alois Paroubek and Regina Podstanická. Discoveries include the minor planets 1807 Slovakia and 1989 Tatry.

See also 
 2619 Skalnaté Pleso, asteroid
 Skalnaté pleso

References

External links

 Skalnate Pleso Observatory, home page

Skalnate Pleso